Isadora Marie Williams (born 8 February 1996) is a Brazilian-American figure skater who represents Brazil in ladies' singles. She is the 2017 Sofia Trophy champion, the 2019 Toruń Cup silver medalist, the 2018 Volvo Open Cup silver medalist, the 2016 Santa Claus Cup silver medalist, and the 2016 Sportland Trophy silver medalist.

She placed 30th at the 2014 Winter Olympics and 24th at the 2018 Winter Olympics. Williams is the first figure skater from Brazil to compete at the Olympics.

Personal life 
Williams was born in Marietta, Georgia. Isadora was raised in the suburbs of Washington, DC. She has Brazilian citizenship through her mother, who is from Belo Horizonte, Minas Gerais, and also lived in Brazil for two years as a child. Isadora Williams also has a very large family that lives in Brazil, which she visits frequently. She attends Montclair State University in New Jersey.

Career 
Isadora Williams began skating at the age of 5 falling in love with the sport while skating in a public session at the Cooler Ice Rink in Alpharetta, Georgia.

Williams trains four hours a day with coach Andrei Kriukov. She has all five triple jumps (Salchow, toe loop, loop, flip, and Lutz) since Worlds 2010. She won the bronze medal at the 2012 Golden Spin of Zagreb.

At the 2010 World Junior Championships, Williams became the third skater in any discipline to represent Brazil at the event. Her highest Junior Worlds placement was 16th in 2012.

In September 2013, Williams competed at the Nebelhorn Trophy, the final qualifying competition for the 2014 Winter Olympics in Sochi. She placed 8th in the short program and 14th in the free skate, finishing 12th overall. As a result of her placement, Brazil received one of the six remaining spots for countries which had not previously qualified for a ladies' entry. This was the first ever ladies' figure skating Olympics entry for Brazil. Williams finished in last place (30th) at the Olympic contest.

In the 2016-2017 season, Williams earned the first gold medal for a Brazilian skater in an international competition at the 2017 Sofia Trophy. 

In 2017, she placed 5th overall at Nebelhorn to once again qualify for the 2018 Winter Olympics. Also in 2017 she placed 2nd at Volvo Open Cup, competition held in Riga, Latvia. During the Olympic tournament, Williams made history by finishing 17th in the short program, enough to become the first Brazilian and South American to ever take part in the skating final. She placed 24th in the Free Skate and placed 24th overall.  She also became the first Brazilian and South American female skater to ever advance to the final segment of a senior World Championship at 2019 Worlds in Japan. She placed 24th in the short and in the free, finishing 24th overall.

Programs

Results 
CS: Challenger Series; JGP: Junior Grand Prix

References

External links

 

1996 births
Living people
People with acquired Brazilian citizenship
Brazilian female single skaters
Olympic figure skaters of Brazil
Figure skaters at the 2014 Winter Olympics
Figure skaters at the 2018 Winter Olympics
Brazilian people of American descent
Sportspeople from Marietta, Georgia
People from Ashburn, Virginia
Sportspeople from the Washington metropolitan area
American female single skaters
American sportspeople of Brazilian descent